Restrepia trichoglossa, commonly called the hairy-tongued restrepia, is a species of orchid found from Mexico (Chiapas) to Peru.

References

External links 

trichoglossa
Orchids of Chiapas
Orchids of Peru